Heinz Beyer (28 July 1910 – 26 April 1975) was a German rower. He competed in the men's coxed four event at the 1952 Summer Olympics.

References

1910 births
1975 deaths
German male rowers
Olympic rowers of Germany
Rowers at the 1952 Summer Olympics
Sportspeople from Szczecin